This is a list of events in 2012 in animation.

Events

February
 February 4: The 39th Annie Awards are held.
 February 14: Matt Groening receives a star at the Hollywood Walk of Fame.
 February 19: The 500th episode of The Simpsons, "At Long Last Leave", is first broadcast, guest starring Julian Assange.
 February 26: 84th Academy Awards:
Rango by Gore Verbinski wins the Academy Award for Best Animated Feature.
 The Fantastic Flying Books of Mr. Morris Lessmore by William Joyce and Brandon Oldenburg wins the Academy Award for Best Animated Short Film.

March
 March 2: The Lorax, based on the Dr. Seuss book of the same name, is released.
 March 23: Disney Junior launches as a 24/7 channel.

April
 April 15: The Simpsons episode "Beware My Cheating Bart" is first broadcast, with the couch gag being animated by Bill Plympton, the first time he did so.

May
 May 3: Carlos Loiseau's Ánima Buenos Aires premiers.
 May 20: The Simpsons episode "Lisa Goes Gaga" is first broadcast, guest starring pop singer Lady Gaga. This episode was panned by critics along with Simpsons fans and Lady Gaga fans and is often considered to be one of the worst Simpsons episodes.

June
 June 8: The third Madagascar film, Madagascar 3: Europe's Most Wanted, is released by DreamWorks.
 June 15: The first episode of Gravity Falls is broadcast.
 June 22: Brave, produced by the Walt Disney Company and Pixar, is released.

July
 July 13: The Simpsons short "The Longest Daycare" premieres, featuring Maggie Simpson and directed by David Silverman.

August
 August 20: Cookie Jar Entertainment was acquired by DHX Media for $111 million, which made DHX the world's largest independent owner of children's television programming. Cookie Jar was later folded on December 25, 2014.
 August 24: Don Hertzfeldt's It's Such a Beautiful Day premiers.
 August 25: Toonzai is replaced by Vortexx

September
 September 20: Tim Burton's Frankenweenie is released.
 September 28: Hotel Transylvania, a film by Columbia Pictures and Sony Pictures Animation is released.

November
 November 2: The Walt Disney Company releases Wreck-It Ralph.
 November 10: The first episode of Littlest Pet Shop is broadcast.
 November 21: Rise of the Guardians, a film by DreamWorks is released.

Awards
 Academy Award for Best Animated Feature: Brave
 Academy Award for Best Animated Short Film: Paper Man
 Animation Kobe Feature Film Award: K-On!
 Annecy International Animated Film Festival Cristal du long métrage: Crulic: The Path to Beyond
 Annie Award for Best Animated Feature: Wreck-It Ralph
 Asia Pacific Screen Award for Best Animated Feature Film: A Letter to Momo
 BAFTA Award for Best Animated Film: Brave
 César Award for Best Animated Film: Ernest & Celestine
 European Film Award for Best Animated Film: Alois Nebel
 Golden Globe Award for Best Animated Feature Film: Brave
 Goya Award for Best Animated Film: Tad, The Lost Explorer
 Japan Academy Prize for Animation of the Year: Wolf Children
 Japan Media Arts Festival Animation Grand Prize: Combustible
 Mainichi Film Award for Best Animation Film: Wolf Children

Films released

 January 10 - Bratz: Desert Jewelz (United States)
 January 12: 
 The Outback (United States and South Korea)
 Pleasant Goat and Big Big Wolf: Mission Incredible: Adventures on the Dragon's Trail (China)
 January 21:
 .hack//The Movie (Japan)
 An Oversimplification of Her Beauty (United States)
 January 26 - The Illusionauts (Peru)
 January 27 - Back to the Sea (China)
 January 31 - Leapfrog: Numberland (United States)
 February 2 - Selkirk, the Real Robinson Crusoe (Uruguay, Argentina, and Chile)
 February 4 - Berserk Golden Age Arc I: The Egg of the King (Japan)
 February 8 - Zarafa (France)
 February 11 - Dragon Age: Dawn of the Seeker (United States and Japan)
 February 21 - Where the Dead Go to Die (United States)
 February 22 - Sprookjesboom de Film (Netherlands)
 February 27 - Barbie in A Mermaid Tale 2 (United States)
 February 28 - Justice League: Doom (United States)
 March 2 - The Lorax (United States)
 March 6 - VeggieTales: Robin Good and His Not-So-Merry Men (United States)
 March 11 - Ben 10: Destroy All Aliens (Singapore)
 March 13 - Scooby-Doo! Music of the Vampire (United States)
 March 17: 
 Pretty Cure All Stars New Stage: Friends of the Future (Japan)
 Strike Witches (Japan)
 March 28 - The Pirates! in an Adventure with Scientists (United States and United Kingdom)
 April 13 - Sir Billi: Guardian of the Highlands (Scotland)
 April 14:
 Crayon Shin-chan: Arashi o Yobu! Ora to Uchū no Princess (Japan)
 Detective Conan: The Eleventh Striker (Japan)
 May - Blackie & Kanuto (Spain, Italy, and France)
 May 3 - Strange Frame: Love & Sax (United States)
 May 4 - Cycle (Hungary)
 May 16 - Ivan the Incredible (Denmark)
 May 18 - Chhota Bheem and the Curse of Damyaan (India)
 May 19 - Niji-Iro Hotaru: Eien no Natsu Yasumi (Japan)
 May 24 - Komm, wir finden einen Schatz! (Germany)
 May 25 - Arjun: The Warrior Prince (India)
 May 31 - Inspector Martin and the Gang of Snails (Croatia)
 June 2 - Blood-C: The Last Dark (Japan)
 June 6 - Approved for Adoption (Belgium and France)
 June 8:
 Madagascar 3: Europe's Most Wanted (United States)
 Moon Man (Germany, France, and Ireland)
 June 12 - Superman vs The Elite (United States)
 June 15:
 Foodfight! (United States)
 Heart String Marionette (United States)
 June 16 - Library War: The Wings of Revolution (Japan)
 June 22 - Brave (United States)
 June 23 - Berserk Golden Age Arc II: The Battle for Doldrey (Japan)
 June 28 - Seer 2 (China)
 July 3 - Zambezia (South Africa)
 July 5 - Legend of the Moles: The Treasure of Scylla (China)
 July 7 - The Life of Guskou Budori (Japan)
 July 13 - Ice Age: Continental Drift (United States)
 July 14:
 The Amazing Adventures of the Living Corpse (United States)
 Magical Girl Lyrical Nanoha The Movie 2nd A's (Japan)
 Pokémon the Movie: Kyurem vs. the Sword of Justice (Japan)
 July 17 - Branimals – The Forest is Ours (Brazil)
 July 21:
 Starship Troopers: Invasion (United States and Japan)
 The Wolf Children Ame and Yuki (Japan)
 July 25 - Cinderella: Once upon a time in the west... (Belgium and France)
 July 28 - Road to Ninja: Naruto the Movie (Japan)
 August 2 - Echo Planet (Thailand)
 August 3 - Hey Krishna (India)
 August 10 - Yugo & Lala (China)
 August 11 - VeggieTales: The Penniless Princess (United States)
 August 15 - Sammy 2: Escape From Paradise (Belgium)
 August 17 - ParaNorman (United States)
 August 18 - Fairy Tail the Movie: The Phoenix Priestess (Japan)
 August 19 - Wings (Russia)
 August 20 - Pinocchio (Italy, Luxembourg, Belgium, and France)
 August 24 - It's Such a Beautiful Day (United States)
 August 25 - After School Midnighters (Japan)
 August 30 - The Star Making Machine (Argentina)
 August 31:
 Secret of the Wings (United States)
 Tad, the Lost Explorer (Spain)
 September 3 - Thomas & Friends: Blue Mountain Mystery (United Kingdom)
 September 6 - Raven the Little Rascal (Germany)
 September 8 - A Liar's Autobiography: The Untrue Story of Monty Python's Graham Chapman (United Kingdom)
 September 11 - Barbie: The Princess & the Popstar (United States)
 September 22 - Gekijō-ban Tiger & Bunny -The Beginning (Japan)
 September 25 - Batman: The Dark Knight Returns – Part 1 (United States)
 September 26 - The Suicide Shop (France)
 September 28: 
 Hotel Transylvania (United States)
 Tom and Jerry: Robin Hood and His Merry Mouse (United States)
 September 29 - Asura (Japan)
 October 3 - Kirikou and the Men and Women (France)
 October 4 - Yak: The Giant King (Thailand)
 October 5 - Frankenweenie (United States)
 October 6 - Hajimari no Monogatari (Japan)
 October 8 - The Adventures of Scooter the Penguin (United States)
 October 9 - Big Top Scooby-Doo! (United States)
 October 11:
 Marco Macaco (Denmark)
 Rodencia y el Diente de la Princesa (Argentina and Peru)
 October 12 - Niko 2: Family Affairs (Finland, Germany, Denmark, and Ireland)
 October 13 - Eien no Monogatari (Japan)
 October 16 - VeggieTales: The League of Incredible Vegetables (United States)
 October 18 - Gladiators of Rome (Italy)
 October 19 - Delhi Safari (India)
 October 20:
 Fuse Teppō Musume no Torimonochō (Japan)
 Macross FB 7: Ore no Uta o Kike! (Japan)
 October 24 - The Day of the Crows (France, (Belgium, (Canada, and Luxembourg)
 October 25 - Goat Story 2 (Czech Republic)
 October 27 - 009 Re:Cyborg (Japan)
 October 31 - The Apostle (Spain)
 November 1 - Gothicmade (Japan)
 November 2 - Wreck-It Ralph (United States)
 November 6:
 Gummibär: The Yummy Gummy Search for Santa (United States and Germany)
 The Swan Princess Christmas (United States)
 November 9 - Peixonauta – Agente Secreto da O.S.T.R.A. (Brazil)
 November 10 - Nerawareta Gakuen (Japan)
 November 15 - War of the Worlds: Goliath (United States and Malaysia)
 November 17 - Evangelion: 3.0 (Japan)
 November 21 - Rise of the Guardians (United States)
 November 29 - A Fairly Odd Christmas (Canada)
 November 30 - Dino Time (United States and South Korea)
 December 1 - Inazuma Eleven GO vs. Danbōru Senki W (Japan)
 December 12:
 Consuming Spirits (United States)
 Ernest & Celestine (France, Belgium, and Luxembourg)
 December 14 - Mass Effect: Paragon Lost (Japan)
 December 15 - One Piece Film Z (Japan)
 December 16 - Exchange Student Zero (Australia)
 December 27 - Three Heroes on Distant Shores (Russia)
 December 28 - Blue Exorcist: The Movie (Japan)
 December 29 - The Grow (China)
 December 31 - The Snow Queen (Russia)
 Specific date unknown: 
 Dji. Death fails (Moldova)
 Dog Bowl and Chuki-Cookie (Russia)
 Guide Of Tormes (Spain)
 Spike 2  (France)
 The Waterman Movie (United States)

Television series debuts

Television series endings

Deaths

January
 January 6: Tom Ardolino, American rock drummer and member of NRBQ (voiced himself in The Simpsons episodes "The Old Man and the "C" Student", "Take My Wife, Sleaze" and "Insane Clown Poppy"), dies from diabetes at age 56.
 January 14: Star Wirth, American xerographer (Hanna-Barbera, The Pagemaster, Warner Bros. Animation), dies at age 71.
 January 16: Efron Etkin, Israeli actor (dub voice of Piglet in Winnie the Pooh and Dolf in Alfred J. Kwak), dies at age 59.
 January 22: Dick Tufeld, American actor, announcer, and narrator (announcer and narrator for Spider-Man and His Amazing Friends, Spider-Woman, Super Friends: The Legendary Super Powers Show, The Super Powers Team: Galactic Guardians, Fantastic Four, and Histeria!, voiced the Robot from Lost in Space in The Simpsons episodes "Mayored to the Mob" and "Milhouse Doesn't Live Here Anymore"), dies at age 85.
 January 26: Ian Abercrombie, English actor (voice of Palpatine in Star Wars: The Clone Wars, Ambrose in Rango, Ganthet in Green Lantern: The Animated Series), dies at age 77.

February
 February 8: Laurie Main, Australian actor (voice of Farmer Grey, Squire Douglas Gordon, and Pipe Smoking Stable Owner in Black Beauty, narrator in Winnie the Pooh Discovers the Seasons, and Winnie the Pooh and a Day for Eeyore, Dr. Watson in The Great Mouse Detective, additional voices in The Plastic Man Comedy Adventure Show, The New Yogi Bear Show, and Paddington Bear), dies at age 89.
 February 16: Peter Breck, American actor (voice of Farmer Brown in The New Batman Adventures episode "Critters"), dies at age 82.
 February 24: Jan Berenstain, American children's book author and illustrator (co-creator of The Berenstain Bears), dies from a stroke at age 88.
 February 29: 
 Sheldon Moldoff, American comics artist and animator (Courageous Cat and Minute Mouse), dies at age 91.
 Davy Jones, English actor, singer and member of The Monkees (portrayed himself in the SpongeBob SquarePants episode "SpongeBob SquarePants vs. The Big One", voice of Jim Hawkins in Treasure Island, the Artful Dodger in Oliver Twist, Nigel in the Phineas and Ferb episode "Meatloaf Surprise", himself in The New Scooby-Doo Movies episode "The Haunted Horseman of Hagglethorn Hall" and the Hey Arnold! episode "Fishing Trip"), dies from a heart attack at age 66.

March
 March 5: Joaquim Muntañola, Spanish animator and comics artist (Gonzalez the Fakir), dies at age 97.
 March 6: Robert B. Sherman, American songwriter and composer (Walt Disney Animation Studios, Snoopy, Come Home, Charlotte's Web, The Mighty Kong), dies at age 86.
 March 10: Jean Giraud, French artist, cartoonist and writer (Les Maitres du temps, Tron, Little Nemo: Adventures in Slumberland, Space Jam), dies at age 73.
 March 18: Warren Luening, American musician and trumpeter (Walt Disney Animation Studios, The Nightmare Before Christmas, A Goofy Movie, Casper, Pixar, Space Jam, Anastasia, Family Guy, Stuart Little 2, Looney Tunes: Back in Action, The Polar Express, Ice Age: The Meltdown, The Ant Bully, Teen Titans: Trouble in Tokyo, The Simpsons Movie, Horton Hears a Who!, Shrek Forever After, Alvin and the Chipmunks: Chipwrecked, Despicable Me 2), dies at age 70.
 March 20: Noboru Ishiguro, Japanese film director, producer and screenwriter (Space Battleship Yamato II, Super Dimension Fortress Macross, Super Dimension Century Orguss, Humanoid Monster Bem, Megazone 23, Legend of the Galactic Heroes, Tytania), dies at age 73.
 March 23: Jim Duffy, American animator (Hanna-Barbera, Klasky-Csupo, Duckman), dies at age 74.
 March 25: Edd Gould, British animator (Eddsworld), dies from leukemia at age 23.

April
 April 9: Takeshi Aono, Japanese actor (voice of Shiro Sanada in Space Battleship Yamato, Kami and Piccolo in the Dragon Ball franchise, Rihaku in Fist of the North Star, Japanese dub voice of Joker in the DC Animated Universe, King Harold in the Shrek franchise, Uncle Max in The Lion King 1½, and Sir Topham Hatt in Thomas & Friends), dies at age 75.
 April 18: Dick Clark, American radio and television personality, television producer and actor (voice of Lefty Redbone in The Angry Beavers episode "The Posei-Dam Adventure", himself in the Fantastic Four episode "The Origin of the Fantastic Four", the Pinky and the Brain episodes "You'll Never Eat Food Pellets in This Town Again!" and "The Pinky and the Brain Reunion Special", the Recess episode "Yes, Mikey, Santa Does Shave", the Futurama episode "Space Pilot 3000", and The Simpsons episode "Treehouse of Horror X"), dies from a heart attack at age 82.
 April 22:
Paul Gringle, American comics artist, animator and illustrator (advertising film for Champion Spark Plugs), dies at age 89.
 Buzz Potamkin, American television producer and director (The Berenstain Bears, Teen Wolf, Cartoon All-Stars to the Rescue, Hanna-Barbera, Buster & Chauncey's Silent Night), dies from pancreatic cancer at age 66.
 April 24: Yugo Sako, Japanese film director, producer and animator (Ramayana: The Legend of Prince Rama), dies at age 84.
 April 30: George Murdock, American actor (voice of Boss Biggis in the Batman: The Animated Series episode "The Forgotten"), dies at age 81.

May
 May 2: Digby Wolfe, English actor (voice of Ziggy in The Jungle Book), dies at age 82.
 May 4: Monty Wedd, Australian comic artist and animator (worked for Artransa, Eric Porter and Ralph Bakshi, Hanna-Barbera), dies at age 91.
 May 6: George Lindsey, American actor (voice of Lafayette in The Aristocats, Trigger in Robin Hood, Deadeye in The Rescuers), dies at age 83.
 May 8: Carlos Loiseau, aka Caloi, Argentine comics artist and animator (Ánima Buenos Aires), dies at age 63.
 May 17: Geri Rochon, American color stylist (Starchaser: The Legend of Orin, Lazer Tag Academy, The Angry Beavers), dies at an unknown age.
 May 24: Millie Goldsholl, American film director and producer (Up Is Down), dies at age 92.
 May 29: Dick Beals, American actor (voice of the Speedy Alka-Seltzer in Alka-Seltzer ads, N.J. Normanmeyer in The Addams Family, Reggie van Dough in Richie Rich, Birdboy in Birdman and the Galaxy Trio, Buzz Conroy in Frankenstein Jr. and The Impossibles, Baby-Faced Moonbeam in Duck Dodgers, Ralph Phillips in From A to Z-Z-Z-Z, Davey in Davey and Goliath), dies at age 85.

June
 June 10: Judy Freudberg, American screenwriter (Sesame Street, An American Tail, The Land Before Time, Between the Lions), dies from a brain tumor at age 62.
 June 12: Victor Spinetti, Welsh actor, author, poet and raconteur (voice of Dick Deadeye in Dick Deadeye, or Duty Done, Texas Pete in SuperTed, Glump in The Princess and the Goblin), dies from prostate cancer at age 82.
 June 15: Csaba Varga, Hungarian animator and producer (founder of Varga Studio), dies at age 66.
 June 16: Susan Tyrrell, American actress (narrator in Wizards), dies at age 67.
 June 24:
 Lonesome George, Spanish Pinta Island tortoise (inspiration for the Lonesome Hubert segment in the Futurama episode "Naturama"), dies at age 101-102.
 Iwan Lemaire, Belgian comics artist, animator, photographer and painter, dies at age 78.
 June 27: Don Grady, American actor, composer and musician (Jetsons: The Movie, Globehunters: An Around the World in 80 Days Adventure), dies from myeloma at age 68.

July
 July 3: Andy Griffith, American actor, comedian, television producer, singer and writer (voice of the Narrator in Frosty's Winter Wonderland, Santa Claus in Christmas Is Here Again), dies from a heart attack at age 86.
 July 4: Gerald Polley, American singer, activist and animator, dies at age 65.
 July 8: Ernest Borgnine, American actor (voice of Carface in All Dogs Go to Heaven 2 and All Dogs Go to Heaven: The Series, Mermaid Man in SpongeBob SquarePants, himself in The Simpsons episode "Boy-Scoutz 'n the Hood"), dies at age 95.
 July 12: Kenneth Landau, American comic artist and animator (Walt Disney Animation Studios, DePatie-Freleng, Hanna-Barbera, Cambria Productions), dies at age 86. 
 July 13: Ginny Tyler, American actress (voice of Jan in Space Ghost, Sue Storm / Invisible Woman in The New Fantastic Four, the female squirrel in The Sword in the Stone, Davey's mother and sister in Davey and Goliath), dies at age 86.
 July 16: Frank Andrina, American animator and timing director (Warner Bros. Animation, The Smurfs, Wacky Races, The Flintstones), dies at age 82.
 July 26: Tibor Hernádi, Hungarian animator, film director, producer, screenwriter and storyboard artist (Felix the Cat: The Movie, The Seventh Brother, Red Bull commercials), dies at age 64.
 July 27: 
 Norman Alden, American actor (voice of Kay in The Sword in the Stone and Kranix in The Transformers: The Movie), dies at age 87.
 Geoffrey Hughes, British actor (voice of Paul McCartney in Yellow Submarine), dies at age 68.
 July 29: Chris Marker, French film director and animator (Les Astronautes), dies at age 91.
 July 31: Gore Vidal, American writer and public intellectual (voiced himself in the Family Guy episode "Mother Tucker", and The Simpsons episode "Moe'N'a Lisa"), dies from pneumonia at age 86.

August
 August 2: Mark Klastorin, American voice actor (voice of Bob, Skipper, Man in White and Yuppie Dad in Aaahh!!! Real Monsters, Truckee and other various characters in The Angry Beavers, Fisherman, Ned, Cop #2 and Old Man in Johnny Bravo, Vinnie in Happy Feet, Paul Teutul Sr. in the Celebrity Deathmatch episode "Stand-up vs. Smack Down") and television writer (Back to the Future), dies from cancer at age 61.
 August 6: Marvin Hamlisch, American composer and conductor (voiced himself in The Simpsons episode "Gone Abie Gone"), dies from respiratory arrest at age 68.
 August 14: Ron Palillo, American actor (voice of Rubik in Rubik, the Amazing Cube, Ordinary Guy in the Darkwing Duck episode "Planet of the Capes", himself in the Duckman episode "Westward, No!"), dies from a heart attack at age 63.
 August 16: William Windom, American actor (voice of Puppetino in Pinocchio and the Emperor of the Night, Dr. Marcus Wealthy in Pink Panther and Sons, "Cutter" King in Sky Commanders, Ethan Clark in Batman: The Animated Series, Uncle Chuck in Sonic the Hedgehog, Uncle Bob in the Goof Troop episode "Major Goof"), dies at age 88.
 August 20: Phyllis Diller, American actress and comedian (voice of the Queen in A Bug's Life, Thelma Griffin in Family Guy, the Monster's Mate in Mad Monster Party?, the White Queen in Alice Through the Looking Glass, Grandma Neutron in The Adventures of Jimmy Neutron, Boy Genius, the Sugar Plum Fairy in The Nuttiest Nutcracker, Jane Goodair in the Captain Planet and the Planeteers episode "Smog Hog", Suzy Squirrel in the Animaniacs episode "The Sunshine Squirrels", Lillian in The King of the Hill episode "Escape from Party Island", Mitzi in the Hey Arnold! episode "Grandpa's Sister", Mask Scara in The Powerpuff Girls episode "A Made Up Story", herself in The New Scooby-Doo Movies episode "A Good Medium is Rare"), dies at age 95.
 August 21: Tissa David, Romanian-American film director (Bonjour Paris, worked for UPA, Hubley Studios, R.O. Blechman), dies from a brain tumor at age 91.
 August 22: Jeffrey Stone, American model (model for Prince Charming in Cinderella), dies at age 85.
 August 24: Steve Franken, American actor (voice of Eugene Atwater in Road Rovers, Mr. Beal in Detention, Mr. Janus in the Static Shock episode "Grounded", Rundle in the Batman: The Animated Series episode "The Mechanic", President Generic in The Sylvester & Tweety Mysteries episode "Spooker of the House"), dies at age 80.

September
 September 3: 
 Michael Clarke Duncan, American actor (voice of Tug in Brother Bear and Brother Bear 2, Big Daddy in The Land Before Time XI: Invasion of the Tinysauruses, Future Wade in Kim Possible: A Sitch in Time, Massive in Loonatics Unleashed, Elder Marley in Delgo, Commander Vachir in Kung Fu Panda, Guardian Cat in the Fish Hooks episode "Labor of Love", Groot in the Ultimate Spider-Man episode "Guardians of the Galaxy", Kingpin in the Spider-Man: The New Animated Series episode "Royal Scam", Coach Webb in the King of the Hill episode "The Son Also Roses", Mongo in The Proud Family episode "Smackmania 6: Mongo vs. Mama's Boy", Rashid "The Rocket" Randell in the Static Shock episode "Linked", Rockwell in The Fairly OddParents episode "Crash Nebula", Krall in the Teen Titans episode "Cyborg the Barbarian"), dies at age 54.
 Ottó Foky, Hungarian animator and film director, dies at age 85.
 September 10: Lance LeGault, American actor (voice of Junior the Buffalo in Home on the Range, Yank Justice in Bigfoot and the Muscle Machines, the Chief in Tugger: The Jeep 4x4 Who Wanted to Fly), dies at age 77.
 September 16: John Coates, English film producer (Yellow Submarine, The Snowman), dies at age 84.
 September 17: Roman Kroitor, Canadian filmmaker (Universe, creator of SANDDE), dies at age 85.
 September 20: Michael Rye, American actor (voice of the title character in The Lone Ranger, Apache Chief and Green Lantern in Super Friends, Duke Igthorn, King Gregor, and Sir Gawain in Adventures of the Gummi Bears, J.J. Wagstaff in Fluppy Dogs, Mr. Slaghoople in The Flintstone Kids, Farley Stillwell in Spider-Man), dies at age 94.

October
 October 8: Ken Sansom, American actor (voice of Rabbit in the Winnie the Pooh franchise), dies at age 85.
 October 12: Břetislav Pojar, Czech puppeteer, animator and film director (To See or Not to See, Balablok), dies at age 89.
 October 18: John Clive, English actor (voice of John Lennon in Yellow Submarine), dies at age 79.
 October 21: Run Wrake, English animator and film director (Rabbit), dies at age 46.
 October 22: Russell Means, American activist and actor (voice of Chief Powhatan in Pocahontas and Pocahontas II: Journey to a New World, Shaman and Chief Sentry in Turok: Son of Stone, Thomas in the Duckman episode "Role With It"), dies at age 72.
 October 27: Bill White, American animator and comics artist (Spümcø, Walt Disney Company, DiC Entertainment), dies at age 51.

November
 November 5: Margaret Nichols, American animator (Warner Bros. Animation, Walt Disney Animation Studios, UPA, Fleischer Studios, Snowball Animation, Patin, TV Spots, Creston, Eagle, Hanna-Barbera, Marvel Productions, Universal Studios and Graz Entertainment) and animation director (The Transformers, Inhumanoids, My Little Pony: The Movie, Transformers: The Movie), dies at age 82.
 November 6: Vladimír Jiránek, Czech animator, illustrator and film director (co-creator of Pat & Mat), dies at age 74.
 November 8: Lucille Bliss, American actress (voice of the title character in Crusader Rabbit, Anastasia Tremaine in Cinderella, Nibbles in Tom & Jerry, Smurfette in The Smurfs, Mrs. Beth Fitzgibbons in The Secret of NIMH, Ms. Bitters in Invader Zim), dies at age 96.
 November 22: Mel Shaw, American animator (Walt Disney Company), dies at age 97.
 November 23: Larry Hagman, American actor, director and producer (voice of Wallace Brady in The Simpsons episode "The Monkey Suit"), dies from throat cancer at age 81.
 November 28: Don Rhymer, American screenwriter and film producer (Fish Police, Surf's Up, Blue Sky Studios), dies from complications of head and neck cancer at age 51.

December
 December 3: Fyodor Khitruk, Russian animator and film director (The Story of a Crime, Film, Film, Film, Winnie-the-Pooh, O, Sport, You - the Peace!), dies at age 95.
 December 4: Gerrit van Dijk, Dutch animator, filmmaker, actor and painter, dies at age 73.
 December 7: Rusty Mills, American animator (Warner Bros. Animation), dies from colon cancer at age 49.
 December 15: Maxine Markota, American animation checker (What's New, Mr. Magoo?, DePatie-Freleng Enterprises, Filmation, Daffy Duck's Quackbusters, The Simpsons), dies at age 83.
 December 24: Lee Hartman, American novelist and animator (Walt Disney Animation Studios, Warner Bros. Cartoons), dies at age 82.
 December 26:
 Gerry Anderson, English television and film producer, director, writer and occasional voice artist (Dick Spanner, P.I., Lavender Castle, Gerry Anderson's New Captain Scarlet, Firestorm), dies at age 83.
 Gerald McDermott, American film director, children's book writer and illustrator, dies at age 71.

Specific date unknown
 Esfandiar Ahmadieh, Iranian film director, dies at age 82 or 83.

See also
2012 in anime

References

External links 
Animated works of the year, listed in the IMDb

 
2010s in animation
2012